The 2021 Bahrain Formula 2 round was a couple of motor races for Formula 2 cars that took place on 27–28 March 2021 at the Bahrain International Circuit in Sakhir, Bahrain as part of the FIA Formula 2 Championship. It was the first round of the 2021 FIA Formula 2 Championship and ran in support of the 2021 Bahrain Grand Prix.

Classification

Qualifying 

Note：
 - Jüri Vips was excluded from qualifying for a technical infringement, of Article 4.3.13 of the 2021 FIA F2 Technical Regulations. He started from the back of the grid in both the first Sprint race and the Feature Race.

Sprint race 1 

Notes：
 - Dan Ticktum originally finished seventh, but was given a five-second time penalty for causing a collision with Richard Verschoor, which dropped him to eighth.
 - Guilherme Samaia originally finished ninth, but was given a five-second time penalty for a Virtual Safety Car infringement.
 - Bent Viscaal originally finished twelfth, but was later given a five-second time penalty for overtaking Jüri Vips under yellow flag conditions.

Sprint race 2 

Note
 - Christian Lundgaard was given a 10-second time penalty, which he is believed to have served in the pits under a safety car.

Feature race 

Note
 - Felipe Drugovich, Christian Lundgaard, Jüri Vips and Marino Sato all received five-second time penalties for Safety Car infringements. Bent Viscaal was even given a ten-second time penalty for the same reason.
 - Oscar Piastri was forced to retire after a collision with Dan Ticktum on lap 30, but was classified for the race, as he completed over 90% of the race distance.

Standings after the event

Drivers' Championship standings

Teams' Championship standings

 Note: Only the top five positions are included for both sets of standings.

See also 
2021 Bahrain Grand Prix

References

External links 
 

Sakhir
Sakhir Formula 2
Sakhir Formula 2